The Mutual of Omaha Headquarters Tower will be a , 44 story skyscraper at 14th and Douglas Street in Downtown Omaha, Nebraska. It is estimated that it will be completed in 2026.

On January 26, 2022, Mayor Jean Stothert and Mutual of Omaha announced a pair of major developments for the city. Mutual of Omaha will move its headquarters into the downtown core to the site of the former W. Dale Clark branch of the Omaha Public Library, with a skyscraper that will transform downtown Omaha's skyline; the 677 ft (206 m) height of the building will make it the new tallest building in Omaha. Stothert also revealed plans for a streetcar from the riverfront park to the University of Nebraska Medical Center.

The plan entails the library branch to be out of its current building by September 2022, with demolition in December. On February 2, 2022, the Omaha City Council voted 4 to 3 to approve lease agreements for a new downtown library location, in a building at 1401 Jones Street, a spot just west of the Old Market. Council members Aimee Melton, Brinker Harding, Don Rowe and Pete Festersen voted in favor of the lease, while Danny Begley, Juanita Johnson and Vinny Palermo voted against.

On February 25, 2022, Mutual of Omaha requested more than $60 million in tax increment financing. Omaha Planning Department documents and plans submitted to the city refer to the tower as "Project Beacon." The skyscraper will include 800,000 square feet of office space and 2,200 parking stalls. The skyscraper has a projected price tag of $433 million.

Project Beacon is part of a plan to add 30,000 new jobs and 30,000 new residents in the Downtown Omaha in the next two decades. Several elements are already in the works, including Project NExT at UNMC, redevelopment of the W. Dale Clark library site, and a streetcar running from Midtown to Downtown. Greater Omaha Chamber of Commerce's President and CEO David Brown said in the last decade, the metro's population grew by about 12 percent. Brown said the area needs to continue that momentum, and maybe increase it, if it wants to move forward. "If we don't, then businesses are going to be faced with a situation where if they can't find the people that they need, they will invest in other places instead to find those people and that's just not a good sign for us," Brown said, "If that becomes the norm, then Omaha stops growing. If Omaha stops growing, it doesn't stay the same, it shrinks. Because in this business, you're either growing or you're shrinking. I've long had a dream, that we would be on the list. That when we talk to any college students in the Midwest and say what cities are you willing to consider to live and work in? That Omaha's in their top 10. We're not in the top 10 yet. We're not in the top 20. So we've got some work to do," Brown said. 

The streetcar would span a  stretch from Cass Street to Farnam Street on South 10th Street, Farnam west to 42nd Street, and back to 10th Street on Harney Street. Stothert said the streetcar will be built, operated and maintained without a property tax or sales tax increase. The streetcar will also be free to all riders. According to a press release, the streetcar project is projected to cost $306 million, which includes a 35% contingency. The streetcar system and Mutual of Omaha Tower will be designed in 2022 and 2023, with construction to run from January 2023 through 2025 and testing and initial operation scheduled for 2026.

See also 
 Economy of Omaha, Nebraska
 List of tallest buildings in Nebraska
 List of tallest buildings in Omaha, Nebraska
 List of tallest buildings by U.S. state and territory
 Mutual of Omaha
 Mutual of Omaha Building
 Omaha Streetcar

References

External links
Greater Omaha Chamber Urban core plan
Official Mutual of Omaha company website
Proposed route for Omaha's streetcar
Total Mobility System

Skyscraper office buildings in Omaha, Nebraska
Mutual insurance companies of the United States